Micrapatetis is a genus of moths of the family Noctuidae. The genus was erected by Edward Meyrick in 1897.

Species
 Micrapatetis albiviata Hampson, 1910
 Micrapatetis flavipars Hampson, 1910
 Micrapatetis icela Turner, 1920
 Micrapatetis leucozona Turner, 1902
 Micrapatetis orthozona Meyrick, 1897
 Micrapatetis pyrastis Hampson, 1910

References

Acontiinae